Southern Kurdish is one of the dialects of the Kurdish language, spoken predominantly in northeastern Iraq and western Iran. The Southern Kurdish-speaking region spans from Khanaqin in Iraq to Dehloran southward and Asadabad eastward in Iran.

Name 
'Southern Kurdish' is a linguistic term for a group of related dialects in Western Iran. Speakers are not familiar with the term and do not refer to the language as such. They generally identify the kind of Kurdish they speak as a local dialect (the Kurdish of a given village), or as a regional variety such as "Garūsi".

Variants
Southern Kurdish has many variants, linguist Fattah divides them into 35 varieties. These include:

 Bicarî 
 The most septentrional variety of Southern Kurdish spoken in and around Bijar in Iran. Bicarî is the only Southern Kurdish variety detached from the greater Southern Kurdish-speaking region.
 Qorwa (Chahar Dawli xarbi)
 The Qorwa variety is spoken around Ghorveh in Iran and is related to the variety spoken in Asadabad and other Kurdish-speaking areas in Hamadan Province.
 Kolyayî
 The Kolyayî variety is spoken northeast of Kermanshah, principally in Sonqor County and surrounding counties. The variety also spans into the Kolyai Rural District in Hamadan Province.
 Bilawar
 The principal Southern Kurdish variety in Poshtdarband Rural District in Kermanshah.
 Dinawar
 About 83 villages in Dinavar District speak the Dinawar variety. The differences between the Dinawar and the Kolyayî varieties are anodine.
 Sahana / Lekî-Kirmaşanî
 The Sahana variety, or lakî-kirmashanî has many similar characteristics with Laki and is spoken in Harsin County and in Sahneh. What distinguishes it most from Laki is the lack of the ergative case.
 Kordali  Palai is quite distant, and may be a distinct language.
Other variants include: Bîstûnî, Çihrî, Hersîn, Payrawand, Kirmaşanî, Sanjabî, Xalesa, Çemçemal, Qasirî Şîrîn, Serpuli Zuhawî, Harasam, Kelurî, Îwan, Erkewazî, Şêrwanî, Îlamî, Salihabad, Rîka, Badraî, Melikşahî, Mêxasî, Mihran, Xaneqînî, Mendilî, Duşêxî, Kaprat, Warmizyar, Zurbatiya and Feylî.

Alphabet 
The Southern Kurdish alphabet is very similar to the Central Kurdish (Sorani) alphabet, which is a derivation of the Arabic alphabet.
Southern Kurdish has one additional letter "ۊ"; the Arabic letter waw with two dots above.

See also
Kalhor
Khulam Rada Khan Arkawazi
Sanjâbi
Zangana

References

Biography

External links

 Information regarding Southern Kurdish
Kurdish Academy of Language describing Southern Kurdish
Audio recordings of wordlists and narratives in Southern Kurdish, archived with Kaipuleohone
southern Kurdish Wikipedia

Kurdish language
Languages of Kurdistan

pt:Quelúri
tr:Kelhuri